Atle Skårdal (born 17 February 1966) is a Norwegian former World Cup alpine ski racer in the speed events of Downhill and Super-G. Since 2012, he is FIS racing director for women races, as successor of Kurt Hoch. A two-time world champion in the Super-G in 1996 and 1997, he was also the World Cup champion in Super-G in 1996. Skårdal competed at the 1988 and 1994 Winter Olympics, with a 6th place in the 1994 Super G his best finish.

In 2000, Skårdal was appointed as national team coach of Norway. He has been FIS race director for the women's World Cup since 2005.

He is married to former alpine ski racer Karin Köllerer of Austria; they have three children (2010).

Achievements 
 World Champion in Super-G at the 1996 and 1997
 Silver in Downhill at the 1993 World Championships
 Won the World Cup season title in the Super-G in 1996

World Cup results

Season titles
1 title:  1 Super-G

Season standings

Race victories
 7 wins – (6 DH, 1 SG) 
 26 podiums – (19 DH, 7 SG)

World Championships results

Olympic results  

Skardal was injured in January 1992 and missed the Olympics.

References

External links
 
 Atle Skaardal World Cup standings at the International Ski Federation
 
 
 

Norwegian male alpine skiers
Olympic alpine skiers of Norway
Alpine skiers at the 1988 Winter Olympics
Alpine skiers at the 1994 Winter Olympics
1966 births
Living people
FIS Alpine Ski World Cup champions
People from Lunde, Telemark